Walter Herbert Rasby (born September 7, 1972) is a former professional American football tight end.  Rasby played in 11 NFL seasons from 1994-2006 for seven teams.  He played college football at Wake Forest University.

1972 births
Living people
American football tight ends
Carolina Panthers players
Detroit Lions players
New England Patriots players
New Orleans Saints players
New York Jets players
Pittsburgh Steelers players
Wake Forest Demon Deacons football players
Washington Redskins players
People from Washington, North Carolina